Farmers and Merchants Bank (sometimes abbreviated as F&M Bank) may refer to:

 Farmers and Merchants Bank-Masonic Lodge, Booneville, Arkansas, listed on the National Register of Historic Places (NRHP) in Logan County
 Farmers and Merchants Bank (Mountain View, Arkansas), listed on the NRHP in Stone County
 Farmers and Merchants Bank of Fullerton, Fullerton, California, listed on the NRHP in Orange County
 Farmer's and Merchant's Bank of Central California, Lodi, California
 Farmers and Merchants Bank of Long Beach, California
 Farmers and Merchants Bank of Los Angeles, California
 Farmers and Merchants Bank Building (Idaho Falls, Idaho), listed on the NRHP in Bonneville County
 Farmers and Merchants Bank (Nampa, Idaho), listed on the NRHP in Canyon County
 Farmers and Merchants Savings Bank (Grand Mound, Iowa), listed on the NRHP in Clinton County
 Old Farmers and Merchants State Bank, Ocean Springs, Mississippi, listed on the NRHP in Jackson County
 Farmers and Merchants Bank Building (Monroe City, Missouri), listed on the NRHP in Monroe County
 Farmers and Merchants State Bank (Eureka, Montana), listed on the NRHP in Lincoln County
 Farmer's and Merchant's Bank Building (Red Cloud, Nebraska), listed on the NRHP in Webster County
 Farmers and Merchants Bank (Geneva, New York), listed on the NRHP in Ontario County
Farmers & Merchants Bank (Salisbury, North Carolina)
 Farmers and Merchants Bank (Chouteau, Oklahoma), listed on the NRHP in Mayes County
 Farmers and Merchants National Bank (Hennessey, Oklahoma), listed on the NRHP in Kingfisher County
 Farmers and Merchants Bank of Western Pennsylvania, Kittanning, Pennsylvania
 Farmers and Merchants Bank Building (Eastover, South Carolina), listed on the NRHP in Richland County
 Farmers and Merchants Bank (Clarksville, Tennessee)
 Farmers and Merchants Bank Building (White Bluff, Tennessee), listed on the NRHP in Dickson County
 Farmers and Merchants Union Bank (Columbus, Wisconsin), listed on the NRHP in Columbia County
 F&M Bank (Timberville, Virginia)
 F&M Bank (Tennessee)
 F&M Bank (Clarksville - Downtown, Tennessee)
 F&M Bank (Clarksville - Dover Road, Tennessee)
 F&M Bank (Clarksville - Hilldale, Tennessee)
 F&M Bank (Clarksville - St. Bethlehem, Tennessee)
 F&M Bank (Clarksville - Sango, Tennessee)
 F&M Bank (Clarksville - Tiny Town, Tennessee)
 F&M Bank (Bumpus Mills, Tennessee)
 F&M Bank (Cookeville, Tennessee)
 F&M Bank (Dover, Tennessee)
 F&M Bank (Franklin, Tennessee)
 F&M Bank (Greenbrier, Tennessee)
 F&M Bank (Hendersonville, Tennessee)
 F&M Bank (Lebanon, Tennessee)
 F&M Bank (Midtown, Tennessee)
 F&M Bank (Mt. Juliet, Tennessee)
 F&M Bank (Springfield, Tennessee)
 F&M Bank (White Bluff, Tennessee)
 F&M Bank (White House, Tennessee)

See also
Farmers and Mechanics Bank (disambiguation)